Intellivision Lives!  is a compilation of over 60 Intellivision video games, originally produced by Mattel Electronics and INTV Corporation between 1978 and 1990.  Using original game code and software emulation, Intellivision Productions released the first edition in December 1998 on a Windows and Macintosh hybrid CD-ROM.  A sequel, Intellivision Rocks, was released in 2001 that includes third-party games originally published by Activision and Imagic as well as Mattel Electronics Intellivoice and ECS games.  Versions of Intellivision Lives! were then released for the PlayStation 2, Xbox, and GameCube by Crave Entertainment. In 2010 Virtual Play Games released a Nintendo DS edition.

Some games could not be included due to licensing (e.g. Tron, Lock 'N' Chase, BurgerTime, Loco-Motion, Mission-X, Masters of the Universe, Pac-Man, Dig Dug, Diner, Pole Position, Commando).  Others such as Advanced Dungeons & Dragons: Cloudy Mountain and Treasure of Tarmin are working prototype versions to avoid trademarked names.  Licenses such as Major League Baseball, NFL, NBA, NHL, NASL, PGA, US Ski Team, PBA, and The Electric Company were simply dropped from the titles.  Also included were games never before released and made available for the very first time such as King of the Mountain, Brickout, and Takeover.

In addition to the games, the Crave Entertainment editions, have several unlockables such as the classic Intellivision commercials.  The original Windows/Mac edition is a resource for development history, unfinished prototypes, box art, overlays, instructions, hidden features, programmer biographies, and video interviews.

Games

History and development
In June 1995, former Mattel Electronics programmers led by Keith Robinson started the Blue Sky Rangers Intellivision website.  Blue Sky Rangers being a nickname given to the Mattel Electronics programmers in a TV Guide magazine article from the 1982 June 19 issue.  The website provides the history of the Intellivsion games and credits the programmers and artists. It was well received with fans asking how the games can be played on their computers. In 1997 Intellivision Productions, Inc. was formed by former Mattel Electronics programmers Keith Robinson and Stephen Roney with the purchase of the rights to the Intellivision and its games.

At the same time, a student in Michigan named Carl Mueller Jr. was independently working on reverse engineering the Intellivision.  With the help of Intellivision ROM dumps from Sean Kelly and then William Moeller and Scott Nudds, Carl was able to create the first Intellivision emulator that plays the games on a modern computer.  Sean was fortunate to have two Intellivision prototype cartridges with standard 8-bit EPROMS as opposed to the more complex memory mapped ROMS used by standard cartridges.  William and Scott were able to dump the Intellivision embedded executive control software and graphics ROMS, as well as build a cartridge reader to dump any Intellivision cartridge.

Carl's MS-DOS emulator and a Macintosh emulator created by Intellivisions Productions' Steve Roney would be used in the free Intellipack downloads so anyone could play select Intellivision games on their computers for the first time in 1997.  The Intellivision for PC/Mac Volume 2 download, also of 1997, was the first release of Deep Pockets Super Pro Billiards, the last game programmed for the Intellivision in 1990 but unreleased by INTV Corporation.  They would also be used to play the original Intellivision games in the Intellivision Lives! PC/Mac CD-ROM edition released in 1998 by Intellivision Productions.

PC and Macintosh system requirements
The PC/Mac edition was produced with Macromedia Director and may not be compatible with modern operating systems.  The QuickTime videos, emulators, and Intellivision ROM image files are directly accessible on the CD-ROM.

The Intellivision Lives! PC/Mac v1.0 system requirements:
 PC:  Pentium 90 MHz, Windows 95, 8MB RAM, 8x CD-ROM, QuickTime v3.0 or better
 Mac:  Power Macintosh, OS7.5, 100 MHz, 16MB RAM, 8x CD-ROM, QuickTime

The Intellivision Lives! PC/Mac v1.1 system requirements:
 PC: Pentium 266 MHz, Windows 95/98/Me/2000/XP, 32M RAM, 8X CD-ROM, 16-bit DirectX compatible sound & video cards, DirectX 7 or better, QuickTime v3.0 or better
 Mac: Power Macintosh, OS 8/9/X, 120 MHz, 32M RAM, 8X CD-ROM, QuickTime

Controller functions are mapped to the computer keyboard; an extended keyboard is required to access both left and right Intellivision controllers.  With Macintosh, USB game controllers could be used indirectly with a joystick to keyboard mapper utility.  For PC, Intellivision Productions promoted the Gravis GamePad Pro game controller (game port version).  The MS-DOS emulator, directly accessible on the CD-ROM, also supported original Intellivision controllers through the INTV2PC Hand Controller Interface.  INTV2PC is a parallel port adapter that accepts original Intellivision hand controllers.  This feature although not promoted is documented in the INTVPC files on the CD-ROM.  Modern intellivision emulators and USB controller adapters have since become available, compatible with the Intellivision Lives rom image files.

To play the games using real Intellivision controllers Intellivision Productions supported the use of a device called the Intellicart.  The Intellicart is a RAM cartridge with an RS-232 interface that can accept a copy of an Intellivision ROM image file from a computer.  Rather than play the Intellivision Lives! games through an emulator, they can be played on a real Intellivision through an Intellicart.  Since that time modern Intellivision flash memory cartridges have been made that achieve the same result.

In 2002 an updated Intellivision Lives! PC/Mac v1.1 was made available by Intellivision Productions.  Those that purchased the original could upgrade for a nominal fee.  It added Windows 98/ME/2000/XP support with a native Windows emulator supporting DirectX sound, video, and game controllers.

Modern video game consoles
Realtime Associates developed the video game console editions published by Crave Entertainment for PlayStation 2 (2003), Xbox (2004), and GameCube (2004).  In these versions the games are accessed from a 3D "overworld" set in a circa 1980s pizza parlor; an inaccurate representation as the Intellivision games were originally designed for a home console. Games were also re-organised by genres rather than the original Mattel Electronics Networks used in the PC/Mac edition.  Some games require two controllers, even to play single player.

In 2010 Virtual Play Games published Intellivision Lives! for the Nintendo DS handheld system, also developed by Realtime Associates. It features wireless, multiplayer support using a single game card. The Nintendo DS'''s touch screen emulates the Intellivision's 12-button keypad including an overlay image for each game.  The Nintendo DS lacks a 16 direction pad used by some Intellivision games.  This limitation was overcome, in Vectron for example, by mapping directional inputs to the touch screen.  Only 10,000 copies of the Nintendo DS edition were ever released.

The Xbox version of Intellivision Lives! is fully forward compatible with the Xbox 360 console, and in 2008 Intellivision Lives! became available for purchase as a download through Xbox Live Game Marketplace's Xbox Originals.

Intellivision RocksIntellivision Rocks is the PC-only sequel to the original PC version of Intellivision Lives!. As with Intellivision Lives!, Intellivision Rocks is a collection of games which were originally found on the Intellivision, presented in emulated form. It mainly features 3rd-party games from Activision and Imagic. In addition, several unreleased games are included.

 Reception 

IGN said that Intellivision Lives! is "still blocky after all these years, sure...but these games really need the controller." GameSpot'' editors said that although the controller emulation is a little hard to handle, the collection does a fine job in delivering classic Intellivision games.

References

External links
 
 

1998 video games
Crave Entertainment games
GameCube games
Intellivision
Multiplayer and single-player video games
Nintendo DS games
PlayStation 2 games
PlayStation Network games
Realtime Associates games
Video game compilations
Video games developed in the United States
Video games scored by George Sanger
Windows games
Xbox games
Xbox Originals games
Quicksilver Software games